Cryptostylis subulata, commonly known as the large tongue orchid, duckbill orchid or cow orchid, is a common and widespread orchid in south eastern Australia and New Zealand. It has relatively large, leathery, dark green to yellowish-green leaves and up to twenty yellowish flowers with a reddish-brown and dark purple labellum. It is often found in damp or swampy situations but also occurs in drier places.

Description
There is a dark purple callus ending in two knobs on the lower side of the labellum.

Taxonomy and naming
The large tongue orchid was first formally described in 1806 by Jacques Labillardière from a specimen collected in Tasmania. Labillardière gave it the name Malaxis subulata and published the description in Novae Hollandiae Plantarum Specimen. In 1871 H.G. Reichenbach changed the name to Cryptostylis subulata. The specific epithet (subulata) is derived from the Latin word subula meaning "awl".

Distribution and habitat
It is tolerant of a range of soils, from well-drained sandy heathland to swampy depressed areas, as well as dry eucalypt forest. It occurs mostly in coastal districts of Queensland, New South Wales, Victoria and Tasmania, although it is also found in the Blue Mountains. In New Zealand it is only known from swamps north of Kaitaia and Taipa-Mangonui.

Ecology
Like other Australian members of its genus, it is pollinated by the ichneumon wasp known as the orchid dupe wasp (Lissopimpla excelsa), the males of which mistake the flower parts for female wasps and copulate with it.

Use in horticulture
Cryptostylis subulata has been successfully grown by orchid enthusiasts, but is slow growing. The rhizomes are delicate and resent disturbance, and need to be moist at all times.

References 

subulata
Orchids of New South Wales
Orchids of Victoria (Australia)
Orchids of South Australia
Orchids of Tasmania
Orchids of New Zealand
Taxa named by Jacques Labillardière
Plants described in 1806